Sukhothai Thani is a small town about  north of Bangkok on the River Yom, a tributary of the Chao Phraya River. The population is 37,000. This city was the capital of the first Thai kingdom, usually called the Sukhothai Kingdom, hence the modern city is often called New Sukhothai. Sukhothai Thani is the capital of Sukhothai province.

External links
 

Populated places in Sukhothai province